You may be looking for:

Swensen's, a Canadian-owned chain of ice cream restaurants
Swensons, a chain of drive-in restaurants located in Northeast Ohio